The Last Note (translit. To Teleftaio Simeioma) is a 2017 Greek drama film directed by Pantelis Voulgaris. It is based on the execution of 200 Greek political prisoners in reprisal for the killing of a German general by Greek partisans in 1944.

Cast
 Andreas Konstantinou as Napoleon Soukatzidis
 André Hennicke as Karl Fischer
 Melia Kreiling as Hara Lioudaki
 Tasos Dimas as Kostas
 Yorgos Karamalegos as Nikos Mariakakis
 Aineias Tsamatis as Christos
 Vassilis Koukalani as Sarantos
 Loukas Kyriazis as Kovacs
 Konstantina Hatziathanasiou as Xenia

References

External links

2017 films
Greek war drama films
2010s Greek-language films
2017 drama films
Films directed by Pantelis Voulgaris
Films set in 1944
World War II films based on actual events
Films set in Axis-occupied Greece
Films set in Greece
Films shot in Crete
German occupation of Greece during World War II
Films about anti-fascism
Greek World War II films
Films about Greek resistance